The Guinea Pig is a 1948 British film directed and produced by the Boulting brothers, known as The Outsider in the United States. The film is adapted from the 1946 play of the same name by Warren Chetham-Strode.

Plot

The "guinea pig" is 14-year-old Jack Read (played by the 25-year-old Richard Attenborough), a tobacconist's son who, following the Fleming Report, is given a scholarship to Saintbury, an exclusive public school. Read's uncouth behaviour causes him difficulties in fitting into the school.

Only after the social changes caused by the Second World War could such a scenario be imagined.

Cast
Richard Attenborough as Jack Read
Sheila Sim as Lynne Hartley
Bernard Miles as Mr. Read
Cecil Trouncer as Lloyd Hartley
Robert Flemyng as Nigel Lorraine
Edith Sharpe as Mrs. Hartley
Joan Hickson as Mrs. Read
Timothy Bateson as Tracey
Herbert Lomas as Sir James Corfield
Anthony Newley as Miles Minor
Anthony Nicholls as Mr. Stringer
Wally Patch as Uncle Percy
Hay Petrie as Peck
Oscar Quitak as David Tracey
Kynaston Reeves as the Bishop
Olive Sloane as Aunt Mabel
Peter Reynolds as Grimmett

Production and reception
The film was from Pilgrim Pictures a new company set up by Filippo Del Guicide. It was financed by a "mystery industrialist".

The school location used in the film was Sherborne School, a public school in Dorset. The film was controversial at the time of its first release, as it contains the first screen use of the word "arse".

The New York Times critic Bosley Crowther, at the time of the film's first American release, was unimpressed. According to Crowther, "the details are highly parochial, the attitudes of the characters are strangely stiff, the accents and idioms are hard to fathom—and the exposition is involved and tedious". British trade papers called the film a "notable box office attraction" in British cinemas in 1949.  A reviewer for Time Out has called it, "solid entertainment, even if barely convincing".

References

External links

Review of film at Variety

1948 films
British drama films
1948 drama films
Films directed by Roy Boulting
British films based on plays
Films set in schools
British black-and-white films
Films shot at MGM-British Studios
1940s English-language films
1940s British films